Bai Yawen  is a former Chinese artistic gymnast. She is the 2014 World balance beam silver medalist. She is also the 2014 World team silver medalist.

2014 was Bai Yawen's first year as a senior gymnast.

At the Chinese National Championships in May, she won the silver on Balance Beam.
Later that year, Bai was selected to represent China at the Asian Games in Incheon where she and her teammates Yao Jinnan, Shang Chunsong, Huang Huidan, Tan Jiaxin, and Chen Siyi won team gold. Bai also competed at the World Championships in Nanning, where the Chinese team won the silver medal behind the United States. Despite individually qualifying to the Balance Beam Final, Bai did not compete in Team Finals. However, she later won the silver medal in the Balance Beam Final behind Simone Biles of the United States and ahead of then-reigning World Champion Aliya Mustafina of Russia.

In February 2015, Yawen competed at the 2015 WOGA Classic, finishing eighth all-around. Later in 2016, she competed in the Doha World Cup, and was ranked 4th in the balance beam final. She was not selected to represent China in Rio Olympics. Her last competition was the 2017 National Games of China. Her foot injury affected her performances, and she didn't enter any final. She announced her retirement after the competition via her personal WeChat account.

Competitive history

References

External links 

1998 births
Chinese female artistic gymnasts
Living people
Place of birth missing (living people)
People from Nanning
Gymnasts at the 2014 Asian Games
Asian Games medalists in gymnastics
Medalists at the World Artistic Gymnastics Championships
Asian Games gold medalists for China
Medalists at the 2014 Asian Games
Gymnasts from Guangxi
21st-century Chinese women